Coleophora inclita is a moth of the family Coleophoridae.

References

inclita
Moths described in 1994